Judge Bradford may refer to:

Allen Alexander Bradford (1815–1888), judge of the supreme court of the Colorado Territory
Cale J. Bradford (fl. 1980s–2020s), chief judge of the Indiana Court of Appeals
Edward Green Bradford (1819–1884), judge of the United States District Court for the District of Delaware
Edward Green Bradford II (1848–1928), judge of the United States District Court for the District of Delaware

See also
William Bradford (Attorney General) (1755–1795), justice of the Supreme Court of Pennsylvania